Amanita muscaria var. muscaria, known as the yellow fly agaric, is a variety of Amanita muscaria.

Rodham Tulloss, and other experts on fungi, limit the habitat of this fly agaric variation to Eurasia and western Alaska.

References

muscaria var. muscaria